Clotilde Jiménez (born 1990) is a multi-disciplinary American artist who works with ceramics, collage, painting, printmaking, and sculpture. His work's common themes, include blackness, gender, masculinity, and sexuality. Jiménez lives and works in Mexico City.

Life and career
Jiménez was born in 1990 in Honolulu to Puerto Rican and African-American parents. His father was a body builder and would go on to influence aspects of his work.

He was raised in a poor neighborhood in Philadelphia. He attended Charter High School for Architecture + Design, a now defunct school that gave opportunities to at-risk kids with creative ambitions.

In 2013, he earned a BFA in printmaking from the Cleveland Institute of Art, and 2018 a MFA from the Slade School of Fine Art, London.

Jiménez works closely with the esteemed art dealer Mariane Ibrahim and is represented by her gallery.

Selected exhibitions
 The Contest, Chicago, 2020
 Un Nouveau Monde, Paris, 2022
 La Vie en Rose, Chicago, 2022

Publications
 Bennett, Joshua; Dunson, Danny; Quinn, Nathaniel Mary; Zimmerman, Emily (2020). Clotilde Jiménez

References

1990 births
African-American artists
Alumni of the Slade School of Fine Art
Living people